Hartikainen is a Finnish surname related to the name Hartwig. Notable people with the surname include:

Erkki Hartikainen  (1942–2021), chairman of Atheist association of Finland
Jani Hartikainen (born 1975), Finnish footballer
Teemu Hartikainen (born 1990), Finnish ice hockey player

References

Finnish-language surnames